This is a list of animated television series produced in India.

Series

See also 

 Indian animation industry
 List of Indian animated films
 List of anime distributed in India

References

 
Television series
Lists of animated television series
Animated